Luther E. Birdzell (December 1, 1880 – February 23, 1973) was an American teacher and lawyer who served as a justice of the Supreme Court of North Dakota from 1917 to 1933. He died at the age of 92 in 1973.

External links
North Dakota Supreme Court biography

Justices of the North Dakota Supreme Court
1880 births
1973 deaths
20th-century American judges